Carolina Ravassa (born 15 June 1985 in Cali, Colombia) is a Colombian actress and producer. A performing arts graduate from Boston College and New York Conservatory for Dramatic Arts, Ravassa is best known outside of Colombia for her voice over work in television series and video games, most notably Sombra from the video game Overwatch and Raze in VALORANT.

Life and career
Ravassa grew up in several countries, spending her childhood between Colombia and the US, and is therefore fluent in 4 languages: English, Spanish, Portuguese, and Italian. She was interested in acting from a young age and her first role was in a local production of The Sound of Music in which she played Gretel. She studied in Spain and Italy, and was then inspired by the power of socio-political change through Theatre of the Oppressed with Augusto Boal in Brazil. She was educated at Boston College, receiving her Theatre Arts degree, as well as undergoing a year of acting for film/TV at the New York Conservatory for Dramatic Arts.

In 2010, Ravassa made an appearance in the Disney film Step Up 3D where she starred as the character Kristin. In 2014 she appeared in two episodes of Showtime's The Affair as Jules. Ravassa has also done work as a voice actress. Her video game appearances include her role as Taliana Martinez from the game Grand Theft Auto V in 2013, and her well known portrayal of Sombra from Blizzard's 2016 game Overwatch.

Ravassa also produces and stars in her One-Woman-Webseries Hispanglo-Saxon where she explores her life as a white Latina in New York.

As well as acting and voice acting, Ravassa is also an accomplished dancer, being particularly drawn to salsa dancing.

Filmography

Video games

References

External links
 

1985 births
Living people
Actresses from Cali
Morrissey College of Arts & Sciences alumni
Colombian film actresses
Colombian producers
Colombian television actresses
Colombian video game actresses
Colombian voice actresses
21st-century Colombian actresses
Colombian actors